Emanuele Torrasi (born 16 March 1999) is an Italian professional footballer who plays as a midfielder for Serie C club Pordenone.

Professional career
Having played for A.C. Milan's various youth teams since 2009, on 15 March 2018 Torrasi signed his first professional contract with the club until 30 June 2022. Torrasi made his professional debut for Milan in a 5–1 Serie A win over Fiorentina on 20 May 2018. He was called up to the senior squad in the 2018–19 and 2019–20 season, but did not make any additional field appearances.

On 18 August 2020 he signed a 2-year contract with Imolese.

On 31 January 2022, Torrasi signed a contract with Pordenone until June 2024.

References

External links
 
 
 Serie A Profile
 FIGC Profile
 Milan Profile

1999 births
Living people
Footballers from Milan
Italian footballers
Italy youth international footballers
Association football midfielders
A.C. Milan players
Imolese Calcio 1919 players
Pordenone Calcio players
Serie A players
Serie C players